Elvira Urusova (born 24 February 1968) is a Georgian athlete. She competed in the women's shot put at the 1996 Summer Olympics.

References

1968 births
Living people
Athletes (track and field) at the 1996 Summer Olympics
Female shot putters from Georgia (country)
Olympic athletes of Georgia (country)
Place of birth missing (living people)